is a JR East railway station located in the city of Kazuno, Akita Prefecture, Japan.

Lines
Yuze-Onsen Station is served by the Hanawa Line, and is located 59.9 rail kilometers from the terminus of the line at Kōma Station.

Station layout
Yuze-Onsen Station consists of one side platform serving a single bi-directional track. The station is a kan'i itaku station administered by Kazuno-Hanawa Station and operated by Yuze-Onsen meeting group, with point-of-sales terminal installed. Ordinary tickets, express tickets, and reserved-seat tickets for all JR lines are on sale (no connecting tickets).

History
The line was nationalized on June 1, 1934, becoming part of the Japanese Government Railways (JGR) system. The JGR became the Japan National Railways (JNR) after World War II. The station was renamed to its present name on December 1, 1995. The station has been unattended since October 1, 1971. The station was absorbed into the JR East network upon the privatization of the JNR on April 1, 1987.

Passenger statistics
In fiscal 2018, the station was used by an average of 24 passengers daily (boarding passengers only).

Surrounding area
 
 Tohoku Expressway -  Yuze Parking Area
Yuze hot springs

See also
 List of Railway Stations in Japan

References

External links

  

Railway stations in Japan opened in 1931
Railway stations in Akita Prefecture
Stations of East Japan Railway Company
Kazuno, Akita
Hanawa Line